Syllepte pallidinotalis is a moth in the family Crambidae. It was described by George Hampson in 1912. It is found in western China and Japan.

References

Moths described in 1912
pallidinotalis
Moths of Asia
Moths of Japan